K.Chokkanathapuram is a small village in Sivaganga district of Tamil Nadu state in India.

Villages in Sivaganga district